Yang Hilang (meaning The Lost One) is a greatest hits album by Indonesian singer Anggun. It was released in 1994 by Blackboard Indonesia, compiling her past Indonesian hits with two brand new songs, "Yang Hilang" and "Masa Masa Remaja".

Release
Yang Hilang became Anggun's final release in Indonesia before moving to Europe to start her international career. The album features her past Indonesian hit singles since 1989 with two brand new songs, "Yang Hilang" and "Masa Masa Remaja". The album excluded all material from her debut and final Indonesian studio albums, Dunia Aku Punya (1986) and Anggun C. Sasmi... Lah!!! (1993). Other notable exclusions from the compilation are "Takut" and "Bayang Bayang Ilusi".

"Yang Hilang" was released as Anggun's final rock single in Indonesia and became another hit on the charts, peaking inside the Top 10 in Indonesian Airplay Chart. The song's lyrics can be interpreted to her music career which was "lost" for three years before coming back with her debut international album, Snow on the Sahara (1997). On the album's cover sleeve, Anggun jokingly wrote the credits as Billy Sheehan from Mr. Big (bass), Rick Wakeman from Yes (keyboard), John Bonham from Led Zeppelin (drum), which were not true.

Track listing

1994 greatest hits albums
Anggun albums